Admiral Sir Edmund Percy Fenwick George Grant,  (23 September 1867 – 8 September 1952) was a Royal Navy officer who served as First Naval Member and Chief of the Australian Naval Staff from 1919 to 1921.

Naval career
Grant saw service in the Egyptian War of 1882 as well as the Brazilian Naval Mutiny in 1893. He was promoted to lieutenant on 1 October 1890, posted as a lieutenant for navigation on the battleship , and promoted to commander (Navigation) on 26 June 1902.

In that capacity he saw his ship torpedoed and crippled at the Battle of Jutland in 1916.  

After the war he was appointed First Naval Member and Chief of the Australian Naval Staff. In this role, he served as defence advisor to Billy Hughes, Prime Minister of Australia at the Empire Conference in London in 1921. He was appointed Admiral Superintendent at Portsmouth Dockyard in 1922 and retired in 1928. He was recalled during the Second World War to serve as Captain at the Port of Holyhead.

References

External links
 

1867 births
1952 deaths
Companions of the Order of the Bath
Knights Commander of the Royal Victorian Order
Royal Navy admirals
Royal Navy officers of World War I
Royal Navy personnel of the Anglo-Egyptian War